Gouania hillebrandii, also known as hairyfruit chewstick, is an endangered species of Gouania that is endemic to Hawaii. It formerly could be found on  Maui, Molokai, Lānai and Kahoolawe, but is today restricted to western Maui near Lahaina. Hairyfruit chewstick is a single branched shrub with small, white flowers.

The plant is federally listed as an endangered species of the United States.

References

External links

hillebrandii
Endemic flora of Hawaii